Renato Alessandrini (August 11, 1890 - May 25 1928) was an Italian explorer who perished during the polar expedition of the airship Italia.

Biographical notes
Alessandrini was born in Rome. From 1914 he worked as rigger at the Stabilimento Costruzioni Aeronautiche, an aircraft factory of the Italian Army Engineers in Rome. Then, after the World War I, he worked at the airport of Ciampino where Italian military airships were assembled and equipped.

North Pole 

The date of the death of Alessandrini is not known with certainty; he was lost on May 25, 1928, when the Italia crashed in the Arctic Ocean during its flight back from the North Pole.

Honors

Italian Honors
In 1924 Alessandrini had a formal commendation and was decorated with the Silver Medal of the Aero Club of Italy for having, on 18 April 1924, returned the aircraft N-1 to landing after that a gust of wind had torn it from the mooring at Ciampino and dragged it away.

Norwegian Honors
On October 7, 1926, the King of Norway Haakon VII granted to Alessandrini the Cross of Knight of the Order of St. Olav, as a participant in the expedition of the airship Norge.

References 

1890 births
1928 deaths
Italian polar explorers
Order of Saint Olav